Selva de Pedra is a Brazilian telenovela produced and broadcast by TV Globo. It premiered on 10 April 1972 and ended on 23 January 1973, with a total of 243 episodes in black and white. It is the eleventh "novela das oito" to be aired on the timeslot. It was created and written by Janete Clair, and directed by Daniel Filho, Reynaldo Boury and Walter Avancini.

Cast

References

External links 
 

TV Globo telenovelas
1972 telenovelas
Brazilian telenovelas
1972 Brazilian television series debuts
1973 Brazilian television series endings
Portuguese-language telenovelas